The World Affairs Councils of America is a network of 93 autonomous and nonpartisan councils across 40 states.

History

The World Affairs Councils of America was founded in 1918. It is the largest nonprofit international affairs organization in the United States.

In mid-February 2011, Chairman of the Board Ambassador Marc Grossman stepped down to become the United States Special Envoy to Afghanistan and Pakistan, replacing Richard Holbrooke. In June 2011, Ambassador Paula Dobriansky filled the position of Chair of the National Board. In June 2015, WACA announced that Ambassador Roman Popadiuk who served as the first United States Ambassador to Ukraine under George H. W. Bush, from 1992 to 1993, has been elected the new chairman of the national Board of Directors. Following a three month co-chair period, Glenn Creamer succeeded Popadiuk as chairman in November 2020, chosen for his work as chairman of the Catholic Relief Services Foundation.

In 2014, the World Affairs Councils of America won the Diversity and Inclusion (DANDI) Award in the international category.

Programs
The World Affairs Councils of America supports a group of 93 councils who present programs annually. The Councils sponsor international exchanges, school programs, teachers workshops, foreign policy discussions, national opinion polls, travel programs, young professionals’ programs, conferences, and corporate programs.

The national association organizes an annual conference, leadership missions to other nations, a speaker referral system, international speaker exchanges, people-to-people diplomacy missions, educational workshops, book tours, subscription discounts, operations workshops, and video-conferences. It has also run national program series such as World Bank Town Meetings, Two Koreas, Future of Russia, Western Hemisphere, Human Rights Worldwide, the EU, Rising Anti-Americanism, American Security, UN Reform, and The People Speak.

WACA has four flagship programs: Academic WorldQuest, Leadership Missions, the annual National Conference, and the Engage America speaker series. The National Conference is an annual event that engages diplomats, experts, members from the business, civic, and education communities with leading policy. Academic WorldQuest is an annual team-based international affairs, geography, history, and culture competition for high school students sponsored by the World Affairs Councils of America. The WorldQuest has been held every year since 2003. WorldQuest was created in 1995 by Jennifer Watson Roberts of the World Affairs Council of Charlotte.

In order to compete at the national WorldQuest competition, teams must first win at their regional council level (usually held from November to March). Every year, 4,000 high school students across the country participate in local competitions hosted by their World Affairs Council.

Leadership missions 
For more than a decade, the WACA has been invited to bring small delegations of council leaders to learn about a host country. A leadership mission consists of an overseas fact-finding visit to a city, country, or organization by a delegation of the World Affairs Council.

Engage America Speakers Series 
The Speakers Series includes partnerships between the National Office and think tanks, foundations, publishing companies, and government agencies to provide speakers to America's communities through our local councils on the critical global issues of our times.

Individual councils
Members councils are located in 40 states, as well as in D.C. and Puerto Rico.
Councils are funded through membership dues, corporate sponsorships, grants, in-kind donations, fundraising events, and fee-for-service activities. Over 2,000 corporations, foundations, and individuals help support council work.

Notes

External links
 World Affairs Councils of America

 
Foreign relations of the United States
Non-profit organizations based in Washington, D.C.
Foreign policy and strategy think tanks in the United States
1918 establishments in Washington, D.C.